Yudra Nyingpo was one of the chief disciples of Vairotsana and one of the principal lotsawa "translators" of the first translation stage of texts into Tibetan.

Yudra Nyingpo became one of the greatest masters of Nyingma Dzogchen Semde and Longdé teachings:
Yudra Nyingpo was a prince of Gyalmo Tsawe Rong (Gyarong) in Eastern Tibet. In Gyarong, Yudra Nyingpo received teachings from Vairocana, who was exiled in the area for a certain period of time. Studying with Vairocana, Yudra Nyingpo became a great scholar and translator. Later he traveled to Central Tibet and received teachings from Guru Rinpoche and he became one of the greatest masters of semde and longdé teachings of Dzogpa Chenpo in Tibet.

Yudra Nyingpo translated many works, including the 'Thirteen Later Translations' of the 'Eighteen Major Scriptural Transmissions of the Mind Series':
Tsemo Chung-gyal (Supreme Peak) 
Namkha'i Gyalpo (King of Space) 
Dewa Thrulkod (Jewel-Encrusted Bliss Ornament) 
Dzogpa Chiching (All-Encompassing Perfection) 
Changchub Semtig (Essence of Bodhicitta) 
Dewa Rabjam (Infinite Bliss) 
Sog-gi Khorlo (Wheel of Life) 
Thigle Trugpa (Six Spheres) 
Dzogpa Chichod (All-Penetrating Perfection) 
Yidzhin Norbu (Wish-Fulfilling Jewel) 
Kundu Rigpa (All-unifying Pure Presence) 
Jetsun Tampa (Supreme Lord) 
Gonpa Tontrub (The Realization of the True Meaning of Meditation) 

Liljenberg (2009: p. 51) holds that there are variances in the listing of the Thirteen Later Translations:
The earliest lists of titles of the Thirteen Later Translations are found in the writings of the twelfth century treasure revealer Nyang Ral Nyi ma 'od zer. He gives two lists, one in his Zangs gling ma biography of Padmasambhava, and the other in his religious history, the Me tog snying po. There are significant differences between the two lists, however, and subsequent lists drawn up by various authors also show marked variations, symptomatic of continuing fluidity in the composition of this group of texts.

Notes

Dzogchen lamas
Scholars of Buddhism from Tibet
Nyingma lamas
Translators to Tibetan
Translators from Sanskrit
Year of death unknown
Year of birth unknown